He was born on 28 March 1884 and educated at Rugby School, before entering University College, University of Oxford to study Law. Upon completing his degree, he rejected the family law practice to study Medicine. After qualifying in 1911 and obtaining the FRCS, he turned to pathology and started to publish papers, with a brief interlude as a Red Cross surgeon in World War I. From 1915, he worked as a bacteriologist in charge of the Standards council, Oxford, and became a Fellow of University College.

In 1936, he then became Professor of Bacteriology under Howard Florey at the Sir William Dunn School of Pathology, Oxford. During this period, he became involved in the penicillin project where he studied the effects of penicillin against the microbes most troublesome to humans, along with Jena Orr-Ewing. He confirmed that penicillin was neither an enzyme, as previously thought, nor an antiseptic that killed them but that the microbes swelled and exploded or died without dividing.

Along with his longstanding position as Chairman of the Board of Faculty of Medicine, this prestigious project aided his appointment by King George VI as Regius Professor of Medicine at Oxford. Some skeptics pointed out his friendship with the Prime Minister of the time, Clement Attlee, whom he met as an undergraduate at University College, as another reason.

In 1953 he gave the Rede Lecture at the University of Cambridge on 'The proper study of mankind'. He retired to Devon in 1956. He died on 28 January 1977.

References 

1884 births
1977 deaths
People educated at Rugby School
Alumni of University College, Oxford
British medical researchers
English bacteriologists
20th-century English medical doctors
English scientists
Fellows of University College, Oxford
Regius Professors of Medicine (University of Oxford)